Soumen Singh (born 27 October 1975) is an Indian former cricketer. He played four List A matches for Bengal in 2001/02.

See also
 List of Bengal cricketers

References

External links
 

1975 births
Living people
Indian cricketers
Bengal cricketers
Cricketers from Kolkata